Tommy Ford (born March 20, 1989) is a World Cup alpine ski racer from the United States. He specializes in giant slalom and super-G; his best World Cup result to date is a first-place finish at a giant slalom event in December 2019.  He has represented the US in three Winter Olympics and five World Championships.

Career
Ford was on skis at age two, as his parents were racers and coaches. Raised in Bend, Oregon, he skied and raced at nearby Mount Bachelor and later attended Dartmouth College in New Hampshire, and has won eight titles at the U.S. Alpine Championships.

During the 2013 season, Ford fractured his right femur in mid-January while free skiing in La Clusaz, France. Following surgery in Annecy, he returned to the U.S. and missed over two years, including the 2013 World Championships and 2014 Winter Olympics. During the 2017 season, Ford had five top-20 finishes in giant slalom and was 25th in the season standings.

Ford attained his first career World Cup top-ten finish in December 2017, a tenth-place finish in giant slalom in Beaver Creek, Colorado. At the 2018 Winter Olympics at Pyeongchang, he was twentieth in the giant slalom at Yongpyong.  Ford scored two more top-tens in March with a ninth at Kranjska Gora and an eighth at the World Cup finals at Åre and was 17th in the giant slalom standings for the 2018 season.

During the 2019 season, Ford had four top-ten finishes in giant slaloms and was tenth in the GS season standings.

Ford began the 2020 season with his strongest finish to date, with a fourth in the opening GS at Sölden, Austria.  Several weeks later, he earned his first World Cup podium with a win in the giant slalom at Beaver Creek in December 2019.

He has qualified to represent the United States at the 2022 Winter Olympics.

World Cup results

Season standings

^

Race podiums
 1 win – (1 GS)
 3 podiums  – (3 GS), 16 top tens (15 GS, 1 PG)

World Championship results

Olympic results

References

External links

 
 
 Tommy Ford at U.S. Ski Team
 Tommy Ford at Head Skis

Alpine skiers at the 2010 Winter Olympics
Alpine skiers at the 2018 Winter Olympics
Alpine skiers at the 2022 Winter Olympics
American male alpine skiers
Olympic alpine skiers of the United States
Sportspeople from Bend, Oregon
1989 births
Living people